Stanley Goagoseb (born 7 March 1967) is a Namibian former footballer who played as a defender or midfielder. He played internationally with Namibia and appeared at the 1998 Africa Cup of Nations. Goagoseb was often known by the nicknames 'Tiger' or 'Big Cat'.

Early life
Goagoseb was born in Windhoek in 1967, but at the age of one, his family was forced to relocate to Katutura. Goagoseb attended multiple schools, including A.I Steenkamp, Jan Jonker Afrikaner High School, Braunfels Boys Boarding School and Ella Du Plessis High School.

Club career
His started his career at Civics in 1984 at the age of 17, where he would remain for the entirety of his career.

International career
He made his debut for Namibia in 1992, as a second-half substitute in a 3–0 defeat to Madagascar.

Goagoseb was part of the Namibia squad at the 1998 Africa Cup of Nations, and made three appearances as Namibia were eliminated in the group stage.

Style of play
Goagoseb started his career as a midfielder, before transferring to a defender in his later career. He was often known by the nicknames 'Tiger' or 'Big Cat'.

References

External links
 
 

Living people
1967 births
Footballers from Windhoek
Association football defenders
Association football midfielders
Namibia international footballers
F.C. Civics Windhoek players
1998 African Cup of Nations players
Namibia Premier League players
Namibian men's footballers